Martin Elsaesser (28 May 1884 – 5 August 1957) was a German architect and professor of architecture. He is especially well known for the many churches he built.

Life
From 1901 to 1906, Elsaesser studied architecture at the Technical University of Munich under Friedrich von Thiersch and the Technical University of Stuttgart under Theodor Fischer. In 1905 he won the competition for the Lutheran church of Baden-Baden and started to be active as a freelance architect.

From 1911 to 1913, he served as an assistant to Professor Paul Bonatz, at Stuttgart Technical University. In 1913, he became professor for medieval architecture at the same institution (until 1920).

From 1920 to 1925, he was managing director of the School of Arts and Crafts at Cologne (later known as the Kölner Werkschulen). In 1925, Ernst May, then government building surveyor in Frankfurt am Main, made him chief of the city's municipal building department which was responsible for the New Frankfurt project. Elsaesser kept that post until 1932. His largest construction during his time at Frankfurt was the Grossmarkthalle.

During the reign of National Socialism, Elsaesser did not receive any commissions. Nonetheless, he did not opt for emigration; instead he spent the war years in internal exile, pursuing architectural study tours and utopian designs.

After the war, he was professor of design at Munich Technical University from 1947 to 1956.

Many of his churches contain paintings by the artist Käte Schaller-Härlin.

His grandson is the international film historian Thomas Elsaesser.

Buildings (selection) 

1909: Königliche Fachschule für Edelmetallindustrie Schwäbisch Gmünd, today Hochschule für Gestaltung
1909–1910: Lutheran church of St. Eberhard, Tübingen
1909–1910: Secondary School, Tübingen
1910: Railway bridge, Tübingen
1910–1913: Lutheran Church, Stuttgart-Gaisburg
1911: Lutheran church of St. George, Massenbach
1911–1914: Covered market, Stuttgart
1913–1914: Wagenburg-Gymnasium (secondary school), Stuttgart-Gänsheide
1922–1924: extension to Kölner Werkschulen
1922–1924: Office block for Rheinisches Braunkohlensyndikat, Mannheim
1924–1925: Private home, Dr. S., Cologne
1925–1926: Lutheran Südkirche, Esslingen
1925–1926: own home, Frankfurt am Main
1926: Part rebuilding of Lutheran Church of St. Laurentius, Stuttgart-Rohr (replaced in 1980)
1926–1928: Grossmarkthalle, Frankfurt am Main
1929–1931: Städtische und Universitätsklinik für Gemüts- und Nervenkranke, Frankfurt am Main, Niederrad
1928–1929: Primary school in Römerstadt, Frankfurt am Main
1930–1932: Villa Reemtsma, Hamburg-Altona
1937–1938: Sumerbank Headquarters, Ankara, Turkey
1950–1951: Residential high-rise, Munich
1953–1954: Rebuilding of Gustav-Siegle-Haus (Stuttgart Philharmonic)

References

External links 

 
 
 
 
 
 Martin-Elsaesser-Kirchen
 Biography of Martin Elsaesser
 Martin-Elsaesser-Stiftung
 Fotografische Sammlung zum Neuen Frankfurt von Matthias Matzak mit zahlreichen Abbildungen der Bauten von Martin Elsaesser.
 Großmarkthalle Frankfurt am Main

1884 births
1957 deaths
20th-century German architects
Expressionist architects
Technical University of Munich alumni
Officers Crosses of the Order of Merit of the Federal Republic of Germany